James Wayne Goulding is a New Zealand former rugby league footballer who represented New Zealand five times.

Playing career
A Richmond Bulldogs player in the Auckland Rugby League competition, Goulding won the Bert Humphries Memorial Medal in 1985 for the most improved forward.

In 1988 he joined the new Newcastle Knights franchise in the New South Wales Rugby League premiership and played for the Knights for three seasons.

In 1995 he joined the new Western Reds franchise, but only played one game for the new club.

Representative career
An Auckland representative, Goulding also represented New Zealand from 1985 until 1989 - playing in five matches for the New Zealand national rugby league team.

He spent the 1993 season with the Wellington side, coming in as a replacement for John Lomax who signed with the Canberra Raiders before the season began.

References

External links
NZRL Roll of Honour

New Zealand rugby league players
Auckland rugby league team players
Wellington rugby league team players
Western Reds players
Richmond Bulldogs players
Newcastle Knights players
Hull Kingston Rovers players
New Zealand national rugby league team players
Rugby league second-rows
Rugby league props
1966 births
Living people